Frank Lugard Brayne  (6 January 1882 – 3 April 1952) was an administrator in the Indian Civil Service (ICS) during the British Raj era. A nephew of Lord Lugard, who was zealous in his attempts to improve what he considered to be a "backward" Africa (to fight against slavery and human sacrifice), Brayne had a similar evangelical outlook and was considered to be a maverick in the ICS. He attracted the opprobrium of both his colleagues and Indian people themselves in his attempts to improve the life of villagers in the Punjab Province of India.

Life 
Frank Lugard Brayne was born on 6 January 1882. A son of the Reverend R. T. W. Brayne, he attended Monkton Combe School before being admitted to Pembroke College, Cambridge, where he held a scholarship.

Brayne passed the competitive examination for appointment to the Indian Civil Service (ICS) in 1905. He was sent to the Punjab, where he worked for some time as secretary to Delhi Municipality during the period when the planning of New Delhi was underway. During World War I, he served with the 18th Lancers of the British Indian Army, being mostly based in the Middle East. He was appointed a temporary lieutenant in June 1915, and the Kingdom of Serbia awarded him the Order of St. Sava, fifth class, in 1917.

He was awarded the Military Cross in 1919 while serving as a temporary lieutenant in Egypt. The citation for that award was: 

After the war, Brayne returned to the Punjab and in 1920 he married Iris Goodeve, a daughter of Edgar Goble. To counter the deprivation, Brayne initiated what became known as the Gurgaon Scheme, in which he hoped to alleviate the plight of peasants in all its aspects by encouraging and facilitating the idea of self-help. He wrote several books about this, including Village Uplift in India, Socrates in an Indian Village, Socrates Persists in India, and Socrates at School, as well as one comparing rural life in India with that of England. The scheme was not a success.

Clive Dewey argued, in his book Anglo-Indian Attitudes: The Mind of the Indian Civil Service, that Brayne's approach to rural uplift was bound to fail, because Indian peasants did not share Brayne's evangelical values – not least his belief that poverty-stricken cultivators in famine-stricken areas could revolutionise their standard of living by working harder and practising thrift, without any assistance from the state.   His conclusions, which were supported by years of research in Indian archives and by extensive interviews with Brayne's contemporaries, were accepted by several members of the ICS and have been endorsed by subsequent historians.  Philip Mason, himself a former member of the ICS, and the author of the most famous history of the service, described Brayne as being  More recently, Atiyab Sultan said that Brayne's interventionism had a "missionary zeal" and that his methods were "more prescriptive" than those of Malcolm Lyall Darling, who was another somewhat maverick British administrator in Punjab.

One of Brayne's sons, Thomas Lugard Brayne, became embroiled in a controversy in The Times Literary Supplement and the Telegraph following the publication of Dewey's book in 1993. He believed that Dewey had seriously misrepresented his father, unreasonably portrayed the character of the ICS itself, and misled the Brayne family, whose collection of private papers he used.  In his rejoinders, Dewey pointed out that when he asked for permission to use Brayne's papers, he believed that Brayne's Gurgaon Experiment had been a success, because he only had Brayne's vainglorious accounts of his own achievements to go on; and he only lost confidence in Brayne's form of "rural reconstruction" after the overwhelming mass of evidence showed how dismally it had failed.  It was impossible, he maintained, to take Brayne at his own valuation.  Brayne boasted that he could 'do anything with propaganda' – and propaganda is what his work remained.  At best, it raised the official awareness of the problems of the peasantry, without providing effective solutions.

By 1937, Brayne was Commissioner for Rural Reconstruction in the Punjab and in 1940 he was Financial Commissioner (Development) there. In December 1941, he was appointed as a 2nd lieutenant, having retired from the ICS to become welfare officer and then Commissioner for Resettlement of Soldiers in Punjab.

Brayne returned to England prior to Indian independence. He died on 3 April 1952 at The Glebe, at which time his military rank was stated as being Colonel. He was survived by his wife, four sons and two daughters.

Awards 
Aside from being awarded the Military Cross, Brayne was appointed a Companion of the Order of the Indian Empire in 1941, having been made a Companion of the Order of the Star of India in 1937. He also held the Volunteer Decoration. His wife, Iris Goodeve Brayne, had been awarded the Kaiser-i-Hind Medal in 1928.

See also 
Mark Lugard Brayne

References 
Citations

Further reading 

1952 deaths
Indian Civil Service (British India) officers
Economy of British India
Companions of the Order of the Star of India
Companions of the Order of the Indian Empire
Recipients of the Military Cross
British Indian Army officers
Indian Army personnel of World War II
People from Ashill, Norfolk
Recipients of the Order of St. Sava
Alumni of Pembroke College, Cambridge
People educated at Monkton Combe School
20th-century English writers
20th-century English male writers
20th-century English farmers
English evangelicals
History of Punjab
1882 births
Abolitionists